Danny Knicely (born 1975 in Rockingham County, Virginia) is an American country and bluegrass musician. In addition to singing, he plays guitar, fiddle, and mandolin. His album releases include: The Evenin' News, Chop, Shred & Split, Waltz for Aimee, The Melody Lingers, Roots and Branches, and Murders, Drownings and Lost Loves (2006) — which he recorded with Will Lee.

He is musical director for the Mountain Music Project, a nonprofit supporting traditional musicians around the world, and played a major role in the film“The Mountain Music Project” which documents a journey Tara Linhardt and he took through the Himalayas of Nepal and the mountains of Virginia exploring the connections between these two mountain cultures (and their music).

Early 
Knicely's grandfather, A. O. Knicely – known as "A.O.K." – played old-time guitar, mandolin, and fiddle as leader of the Knicely Family Band from the 1930s on. His father, Glen Shelton Knicely (d. December 17, 2018), who was born August 11, 1940 in Augusta County, Virginia, played bass and banjo in A.O.K.’s band – and led his own country and bluegrass band, Dominion Express. Knicely's mother created Heartland, a country and gospel band, and the Massanutten Mountain Cloggers.

Knicely got his first instrument, a ukelele, when he was seven years old. His father tried tuned it as a mandolin and broke half the strings. When he was eight a cousin gave him a cassette taped from old Django Reinhardt 78s played on a windup Victrola, igniting a lifelong musical eclecticism.

He played upright and electric bass in his middle school band, turning professional at 14 when he joined his mother's band as a bassist providing baritone vocal harmony.

When Spike Stroop, a Virginia bluegrass fiddler, heard Danny he used him as rhythm guitarist for fiddle contests and festivals. It was at the Galax Old Fiddler's Convention that Will Lee, son of Ricky Lee who played lead guitar with the Stanley Brothers, first jammed with the 15-year-old phenom. Will lived for a while with the rest of his family on Ralph Stanley’s farm on Smith Ridge in Virginia. Lee started bringing his guitarist, the flatpicking virtuoso Larry Keel, over on weekends to jam with his new find. This combo grew into Magraw Gap, a "high energy threesome playing wild, creative bluegrass arrangements that folded in licks from jazz, blues, rock ‘n’ roll, and even reggae." John Flower would join later. Group members called their style "spacegrass".

Music career

Magraw Gap 
Magraw Gap – a bluegrass band including Knicely, Will Lee, John Flower, and Larry Keel – took first place at the Telluride Bluegrass Festival in 1995. The group inspired the formation of Walker's Run in Lexington, Virginia, an act Knicely has performed with often.

Other groups 
Other groups Knicely has performed with include: Danny Knicely with Wyatt Rice & Mark Schatz, The Melody Lingers On, The Mountain Music Project, Furnace Mountain, The Meaning of Buckdance, Ouros, Bluegrass & Beyond, and Purgatory Mountain. He also performed with John Flower in David Via and Corn Tornado and with Will Lee in Walker's Run.

As session musician, producer, and arranger Knicely has recorded with such other act as Nate Leath, James Leva, Keller Williams, Tim O'Brien, Sarah Jarosz, Bruce Molsky, Tony Trischka, The Woodshedders, Rooster Ruley, Gary Ruley, and Chance McCoy of Old Crow Medicine Show.

Knicely, Will Lee, and John Flower – all original members of Magraw Gap – recorded The Evening News as a trio in 2017. The release features "originals, old favorites, a cappella numbers, hot instrumentals, and tight harmony singing."

Venues 

Knicely has performed at a number of music festivals, including: MerleFest, Telluride Bluegrass Festival, Rockygrass, Smilefest, Delfest, FloydFest, and the Grass Roots Festival. Prominent stages where he's performed include: the Kennedy Center, Lincoln Center, Strathmore Hall, The Prism Coffeehouse, Jefferson Theater (Charlottesville), The Birchmere, House of Blues (Los Angeles), The Fillmore Auditorium (San Francisco), Nissan Pavilion, Station Inn, Country Music Hall of Fame, and Opryland Theater.

Mountain Music Project 
Knicely serves as musical director for the Mountain Music Project, a nonprofit organization supporting traditional musicians around the world. The feature-length film"The Mountain Music Project" documents a journey Tara Linhardt and he – both Loudoun County-based performers of bluegrass and old-time Appalachian music based (musically) in Taylorstown who have worked together for two decades – took through the Himalayas of Nepal and the mountains of Virginia as they explore the connections between these two mountain cultures.

The idea for The Mountain Music Project originated with Linhardt in college when she spent a study year in Nepal. In 2002, she and Knicely traveled back to Nepal, where she was able to reconnect with some people she knew from years ago. In Kathmandu – after meeting Buddhiman Gandharba, a member of the Gandharba musician caste – Knicely noticed during an impromptu jam session the "striking similarities" between some of the Nepalese songs and those of Appalachia. As Linhardt recalls:

Knicely and Linhardt teamed with producer Jacob Penchansky in 2006 and began filming the documentary and recording related music. They traveled through Virginia to record songs and stories of traditional Appalachian musicians. The film juxtaposes clips of the Gandharba and Appalachian people "making music and talking about their lives and traditions," highlighting their "parallel traditions".

The film won best independent documentary at the Carolina Film and Video Festival, best film at the International Folk Music Film Festival in Nepal, and the Sierra Nevada Award at the Mountain Film Festival.

Style and sound 
As when he was with Magraw Gap, Knicely is known for playing high-energy "wild, creative bluegrass arrangements" that integrate "licks from jazz, blues, rock ‘n’ roll, and even reggae." He offers "cutting tenor" vocals on arrangements.

Distinctions and awards 
 Magraw Gap – including Knicely, Will Lee, John Flower, and Larry Keel – took first place at the 1995 Telluride Bluegrass Festival.
 He participated in performances dubbed "Africa Meets Appalachia", blending his musical styles with those of Cheick Hamala, a master of a traditional Malian instrument known as "ngoni", reprised as "From Mali to Appalachia" at The Floyd Country Store in Floyd, Virginia in 2021.
 Knicely collaborated with musicians in a dozen countries across several continents including U.S. State Department tours in Morocco, Tunisia, and Russia.
 His documentary film "The Mountain Music Project" has won best independent documentary at the Carolina Film and Video Festival, best film at the International Folk Music Film Festival in Nepal, and the Sierra Nevada Award at Mountainfilm in Telluride, Colorado.
 Knicely placed 10th in Bluegrass Fiddle at the 2022 Old Fiddler Convention in Galax, Virginia.

Discography
 Murders, Drownings and Lost Loves (2006)
 Roots and Branches (2007)
 The Melody Lingers (2010)
 Waltz for Aimee (2014)
 The Evenin' News (2017)
 Chop, Shred & Split (2015)

Instruments 
Knicely plays a vintage Martin D-18 guitar, which he showcased at a September 7, 2014 CD release concert. He prefers a Peluso P-84 microphone.

See also
 Old time fiddle
 Old-time music

References

External links 

 
 The Mountain Music Project

1955 births
American country guitarists
American male guitarists
American country singer-songwriters
American fiddlers
American folk musicians
Living people
Bluegrass musicians from Virginia
Country musicians from Virginia
Singer-songwriters from Virginia
American bluegrass mandolinists
Guitarists from Virginia
Mapleshade Records albums
20th-century American guitarists
People from Rockingham County, Virginia
21st-century American violinists
20th-century American male musicians
21st-century American male musicians
Mapleshade Records artists
American male singer-songwriters